Helen Gould may refer to:

Helen Miller Shepard (1868–1938), née Gould, American philanthropist
Helen Beresford, Baroness Decies (1893–1931), American socialite and philanthropist born Helen Vivien Gould
Helen Margaret Kelly (1884–1952), American socialite, named Gould during her marriage to Frank Jay Gould

Helen Miller Gould (schooner)

Gould, Helen